The Marília Formation is a geological formation in Minas Gerais state of southeastern Brazil. Its strata date back to the Maastrichtian, and are part of the Bauru Group.

The fossil-bearing Serra da Galga and Ponte Alta members were originally thought to belong to this formation but were split off into the Serra da Galga Formation in 2020.

Fossil content

Crurotarsans

Ornithodirans

See also 
 List of dinosaur-bearing rock formations

References 

 
Geologic formations of Brazil
Cretaceous Brazil
Sandstone formations
Mudstone formations
Siltstone formations
Limestone formations
Fluvial deposits
Lacustrine deposits
Cretaceous paleontological sites of South America
Paleontology in Brazil
Landforms of Minas Gerais